Bartosz Romańczuk (born October 28, 1983 in Olecko) is a Polish footballer (midfielder) playing currently for Motor Lublin.

Career

Club 
In June 2010, Romańczuk joined ŁKS Łódź on a one-year contract basis.

References

External links 
 

Living people
1983 births
Polish footballers
ŁKS Łódź players
Jagiellonia Białystok players
VfL Wolfsburg players
Rodos F.C. players
Panachaiki F.C. players
People from Olecko
Sportspeople from Warmian-Masurian Voivodeship
Association football defenders